Evander son of Evander from Beroea was a Roman-era Macedonian sculptor of the 1st century AD.  A well-preserved relief of the Flavian period, was signed by him. Two other signatures of Evander are also found in Lete and Larissa.

References

Grabdenkmäler mit Porträts aus Makedonien (1998) 55, 51
List of sculptures in the Archaeological Museum of Thessaloniki 56
Cultural and Educational Technology Institute  search 

1st-century Greek sculptors
Ancient Beroeans
Roman-era Macedonians
Ancient Macedonian sculptors